Mohegan Sun Arena at Casey Plaza (originally Northeastern Pennsylvania Civic Arena and Convention Center, formerly First Union Arena and Wachovia Arena) is an 8,050-seat multi-purpose arena located in Wilkes-Barre Township, Pennsylvania just northeast of Wilkes-Barre.

History
Built in 1998 on land given by the Greater Wilkes-Barre Chamber, the arena was originally named the Northeastern Pennsylvania Civic Arena and Convention Center. In 2000, the naming rights were sold to First Union Bank, becoming First Union Arena, until the summer of 2003, when First Union Bank merged into Wachovia, at which point it became Wachovia Arena at Casey Plaza. On January 20, 2010, the arena became Mohegan Sun Arena at Casey Plaza as part of a 10-year naming rights contract with the Mohegan Sun at Pocono Downs racetrack and casino.

It has been home to the Wilkes-Barre/Scranton Penguins of the AHL since 1999, and the former home of the Wilkes-Barre/Scranton Pioneers of the AF2 League. In 2012, there were plans for it to be the home indoor arena for the Wilkes-Barre/Scranton Shamrocks of the North American Lacrosse League, but the league subsequently folded.

Recognition and events
The Mohegan Sun Arena at Casey Plaza has been recognized by many entertainment magazines as one of the best in the country for arenas under 10,000 in capacity, especially for its attendance and ease of show setup and teardown. The Penguins hold the American Hockey League record for most sellouts in a season, selling out all 40 home games in 2002–2003 and 2003–2004, and ran a streak of 90 consecutive sellouts between March 2002 and October 2004, and 54 from December 2000 to February 2002.

Other than Wilkes-Barre/Scranton Penguins hockey games, other events that occur at the arena include circus performances, an annual Christmas-time Trans-Siberian Orchestra performance, professional ice-skating shows, Harlem Globetrotters, Monster Jam, and the annual graduation ceremonies for nearby Crestwood High School, Penn Foster High School, King's College, University of Scranton, Luzerne County Community College, and Marywood University.

The arena has regularly hosted professional wrestling since 2000. The first event was WCW Monday Nitro on January 31, 2000. The first WWE live event was on July 16, 2000 and headlined by The Undertaker vs. Kurt Angle. The arena also hosted the 2007 WWE Draft on June 11, 2007 which was the final WWE Monday Night Raw appearance for the late Chris Benoit. This was also the site of the Mr. McMahon limo explosion angle. On November 15, 2016, the arena hosted the 900th episode of WWE Smackdown which saw the return of The Undertaker.

Some notable concerts include AC/DC, Bob Dylan, The Dead, Red Hot Chili Peppers, Foo Fighters, Elton John, Cher, and The Eagles.

Ringling Bros. and Barnum & Bailey Circus performed its last elephant show in its "Red" tour on May 1, 2016, a year before the circus itself closed.

On October 9, 2003, the New York Knicks and New Jersey Nets played a preseason game at the arena.

Political events 
George W. Bush held a rally for re-election to the office of the president at the arena in 2004.

The arena has hosted multiple Donald Trump events, with the first being a rally on April 25, 2016, during his run in the 2016 election. He held another rally on October 10, 2016. Trump later returned as president on August 2, 2018, to assist in Lou Barletta's campaign for Senate. On September 3, 2022, the former President held a rally for the 2022 midterms.

Photo gallery

External links 
 Mohegan Sun Arena at Casey Plaza

References

Indoor arenas in Pennsylvania
Indoor ice hockey venues in the United States
Indoor lacrosse venues in the United States
Wilkes-Barre/Scranton Penguins
Buildings and structures in Wilkes-Barre, Pennsylvania
Tourist attractions in Luzerne County, Pennsylvania
1999 establishments in Pennsylvania
Sports venues completed in 1999